Little Hog Island is an island located in Lake Michigan,  is positioned about  from Hog Island Point on the Michigan's Upper Peninsula. The island is within Hudson Township, Mackinac County, in the U.S. state of Michigan.

References

Islands of Lake Michigan in Michigan